Clay Mann is an American comic book artist who has worked for Valiant, Marvel, and DC Comics.
He has a twin brother named Seth Mann who works primarily as his inker.

Bibliography
Interior comic work includes:
X-Men Unlimited vol. 2 #13: "A Wonderful Life" (with Damon Hurd, anthology, Marvel, 2006)
Four #29-30 (with Roberto Aguirre-Sacasa, Marvel, 2006)
Marvel Adventures: Fantastic Four #21-24 (with Fred Van Lente, Marvel, 2007)
Heroes for Hire vol. 2 #9-14 (with Zeb Wells and Alvin Lee (#14), Marvel, 2007)
Ultimate X-Men #96: "Absolute Power, Part Three" (with Aron Eli Coleite and Brandon Peterson, Ultimate Marvel, 2008)
The Immortal Iron Fist #14: "The Seven Capital Cities of Heaven: Round 7" (with Ed Brubaker, Matt Fraction, Kano and Tonči Zonjić, Marvel, 2008)
Daredevil vol. 2 #111: "Lady Bullseye, Part One" (with Ed Brubaker, Marvel, 2008)
Dark Reign: Elektra #1-5 (with Zeb Wells, Marvel, 2009)
Thor: Man of War (with Matt Fraction and Patrick Zircher, one-shot, Marvel, 2009)
X-Men: Legacy #231-233, 238-241, 245-247 (with Mike Carey and Tom Raney (#241), Marvel, 2010–2011)
X-Men: Prelude to Schism #4 (with Paul Jenkins, Marvel, 2011)
Magneto: Not a Hero #1-4 (with Skottie Young and Gabriel Hernández Walta (#2), Marvel, 2012)
Gambit vol. 5 (with James Asmus, Marvel):
 "Once a Thief..." (in #1-4, with Leonard Kirk (#3-4), 2012)
 "Forever Endeavor" (with Pasqual Ferry and David Baldeon, in #8, 2013)
 "Tombstone Blues" (in #9-12, with Leonard Kirk (#10, 12) and Paco Medina (#11), 2013)
 "King of Thieves" (in #15-17, 2013)
Indestructible Hulk #17: "Humanity Bomb, Part One" (with Mark Waid and Miguel Sepulveda, Marvel, 2014)
X-Men vol. 4 #10-14: "Ghosts and Bloodlines" (with Brian Wood, Marvel, 2014)
X-O Manowar vol. 3 #0: "To the Hilt" (with Robert Venditti, Valiant, 2015)
Ninjak vol. 3 #1-3, 5, 9 (with Matt Kindt and Raúl Allén (#2), Valiant, 2015)
Poison Ivy: Cycle of Life and Death #1-3, 5 (with Amy Chu and Stephen Segovia (#3, 5), DC Comics, 2016)
Trinity vol. 2 (DC Comics):
 "Better Together, Part Three" (with Francis Manapul, in #3, 2017)
 "The New Pandoras" (with Cullen Bunn and Miguel Mendonça, in #7, 2017)
Superman vol. 4 #15-16 (with Peter Tomasi and Patrick Gleason, among other artists, DC Comics, 2017)
Batman vol. 3 #24, 27, 30, 36-37, 50, 78-79 (with Tom King and David Finch (#24), DC Comics, 2017–2019)
 DC Nation: "Joker: Your Big Day" (with Tom King, antholoy one-shot, DC Comics, 2018)
 Batman/Catwoman #1-12 (with Tom King, DC Comics, 2021–2022)
Action Comics #1000: "Of Tomorrow" (with Tom King, co-feature, DC Comics, 2018)
Heroes in Crisis #1-7, 9 (with Tom King, Lee Weeks (#3) and Mitch Gerads (#6), DC Comics, 2018–2019)

Covers only

References

Interviews

External links
Clay Mann on Twitter
Clay Mann deviant art page
Clay Mann profile on Comic Vine
Seth Mann profile on Comic Vine

Living people
American comics artists
Year of birth missing (living people)